Sir Henry Harold Scott KCMG FRSE FRCP FRCS (3 August 1874 – 6 August 1956) was a 20th century British pathologist, bacteriologist and medical author. He was President of the Royal Society of Tropical Medicine and Hygiene 1943-1945.

Life
He was born on 3 August 1874 in Spalding the son of Rev Douglas Lee Scott LLD, later headmaster of Mercers' School, and his wife Mary Elizabeth Rogers. He was educated at the Mercers' School. He then trained at St. Thomas' Hospital and St. Bartholomew's Hospital, London.

He served in the Second Boer War from 1902 in the South African Field Force, receiving the Queen's Medal with five clasps. Returning to England he served as a GP in Ludlow. In 1910 he received a government appointment of state pathologist to Jamaica and lived there for 4 years.

He served as a pathologist for the RAMC in the First World War based at the Cambridge Hospital in Aldershot.

In 1917 he was elected a Fellow of the Royal Society of Edinburgh. His proposers were Henry Richard Kenwood, Daniel Elie Anderson, David Ellis and John Miller.

In 1922 he took another government appointment as pathologist and bacteriologist in Hong Kong. However, he grew ill there and had to return home. He then found an appointment as pathologist at the Zoological Society of London. In 1928 he became Medical Secretary to the Colonial Medical Research Council in London. In 1930 he became Assistant Director of the Bureau of Hygiene and Tropical Medicine.

In 1935 he was created a Companion of the Order of St. Michael and St. George (CMG) and in 1941 was created a Knight of the Order (KCMG).

He retired in 1942, and died in Braintree on 6 August 1956.

Family

He married twice: firstly in 1899 to Harriette Preston (24 January 1873 - 25 January 1933) of Attleborough, Norfolk, who is buried in Highgate Cemetery (east). Following her death, on 1 May 1934 he married Eileen Anne Prichard (20 June 1883 - 1971) of Wilburton, Cambridgeshire.

Publications

Some Notable Epidemics (1934)
A History of Tropical Medicine (1939)

References

1874 births
1956 deaths
British medical writers
People educated at Mercers' School
Fellows of the Royal Society of Edinburgh
British Army personnel of World War I
Royal Army Medical Corps officers
Presidents of the Royal Society of Tropical Medicine and Hygiene